Jorge Alberto Pellicer Barceló (born 7 February 1966) is a Chilean football manager and former footballer.

In the past, he also coached Universidad Católica.

Other works
After leaving Unión Española in 2021, he announced his retirement from professional football coaching.

Honours

Club
Universidad Católica
 Primera División de Chile (1): 2005 Apertura

UA Maracaibo
 Venezuelan Primera División (1): 2007 Apertura

Universidad de Concepción
 Copa Chile (1): 2008–09

Huachipato
 Primera División de Chile (1): 2012 Clausura

References

External links
 

1966 births
Living people
Footballers from Santiago
Chilean footballers
Chilean people of Catalan descent
Audax Italiano footballers
Deportes Temuco footballers
Unión Española footballers
Chilean Primera División players
Primera B de Chile players
Association football midfielders
Chilean football managers
Club Deportivo Universidad Católica managers
UA Maracaibo managers
Universidad de Concepción managers
Deportes Iquique managers
Huachipato managers
Audax Italiano managers
Unión Española managers
Chilean Primera División managers
Venezuelan Primera División managers
Chilean expatriate football managers
Chilean expatriate sportspeople in Venezuela
Expatriate football managers in Venezuela
Chilean association football commentators
Canal del Fútbol color commentators